This is a list of mayors of Brig-Glis, Valais, Switzerland. The mayor (Stadtpräsident or Präsident) of Brig-Glis chairs the city council (Stadtrat).

Brig-Glis was formed in 1973, through the merger of the municipalities of Brig, Glis and Brigerbad.

For earlier mayors, see:
List of mayors of Brig

References 

Brig-Glis
 
Lists of mayors (complete 1900-2013)